Innopolis is an urban settlement in Verkhneuslonsky District of the Republic of Tatarstan, Russia, a satellite of Kazan, the capital of the republic.

Innopolis was established on December 24, 2012 as a technology park ("IT Village"). The change of the status from village to urban was granted to it on December 16, 2014.

Within the framework of administrative divisions, the town of Innopolis is subordinated to Verkhneuslonsky District. As a municipal division, Innopolis is incorporated within Verkhneuslonsky Municipal District as Innopolis Urban Settlement.

References

Notes

Sources

Cities and towns in Tatarstan
Populated places established in 2012
Naukograds
Information technology places